With Everything I Feel in Me is the twenty-first studio album by American singer Aretha Franklin, Released on November 25, 1974, by Atlantic Records.

Background
This recording did not do as well commercially as previous Franklin albums. The LP reached #57 on Billboard's Top Album charts and peaked at #6 on the R&B album charts. None of its singles reached the Top 40 on the Billboard Hot 100. The lead single, "Without Love", written by Aretha's sister Carolyn Franklin and former Motown producer Ivy Jo Hunter, charted at #45 Pop, but fared far better on the R&B charts reaching #6. The title cut also charted at #20 on the R&B charts in early 1975.

Cash Box said that the title song "[builds] slow and steady, it gets into a gorgeous groove with back-up singers, guitar, horns and slinky organ cooking full force under [Franklin's] dynamic vocal."

Track listing

 "Without Love" (Carolyn Franklin, Ivy Jo Hunter) – 3:47
 "Don't Go Breaking My Heart" (Burt Bacharach, Hal David) – 4:17
 "When You Get Right Down to It" (Barry Mann) – 3:55
 "You'll Never Get to Heaven" (Burt Bacharach, Hal David) – 5:40
 "With Everything I Feel in Me" (Aretha Franklin) – 3:53
 "I Love Every Little Thing About You" (Stevie Wonder) – 3:42
 "Sing It Again – Say It Again" (Carolyn Franklin) – 3:51
 "All of These Things" (James Cleveland) – 3:54	  	  	
 "You Move Me" (Glen Murdock, Mike Keck) – 6:22

Personnel
 Aretha Franklin – piano, vocals
 Ken Bichel – synthesizer (3, 6, 7), piano, Fender Rhodes (4)
 Margaret Branch – background vocals
 Brenda Bryant – background vocals
 Cornell Dupree – guitar (1-9)
 Gordon Edwards – bass guitar (1, 2)
 Steve Gadd – drums (7)
 Albhy Galuten – synthesizer (3)
 Ralph MacDonald – percussion (7)
 Arif Mardin – string arrangements (1-4), horn arrangements (2, 4, 6, 7), synthesizer arrangements (3)
 Hugh McCracken – guitar (1-6, 8, 9)
 Robbie McIntosh – percussion (7)
 The Memphis Horns – horns (5, 9)
 Andrew Love – tenor saxophone (5, 9), tenor sax solo (9)
 Ed Logan – tenor saxophone (5, 9)
 Wayne Jackson – trumpet (5, 9)
 James Mitchell – baritone saxophone (5, 9)
 Jack Hale – trombone (5, 9)
 Gene Orloff – concertmaster
 Leon Pendarvis – Hammond organ (7)
 Bernard Purdie – drums (1-4, 6)
 Chuck Rainey – bass guitar (3-5, 7-9)
 Pat Rebillot – Mellotron (3)
 Pat Smith – background vocals
 Hamish Stuart – percussion (7)
 Grady Tate – drums (5, 9)
 Richard Tee – piano, Fender Rhodes (1-4, 6, 9), Hammond organ (5, 8)

Production
 Producers – Tom Dowd, Aretha Franklin, Arif Mardin and Jerry Wexler.
 Recorded by Gene Paul (Tracks 1, 2, 5, 7 & 9); Karl Richardson (Tracks 3, 4, 6 & 8).
 Additional Recording – Lew Hahn
 Mixed by Arif Mardin and Gene Paul 
 Recorded at Atlantic Studios (New York, NY) and Criteria Studios (Miami, FL).
 Art Direction – Bob Defrin
 Photography – Joel Brodsky

References

Aretha Franklin albums
1974 albums
Albums produced by Arif Mardin
Albums produced by Jerry Wexler
Albums produced by Tom Dowd
Atlantic Records albums